Traumatin is a plant hormone produced in response to wound.  Traumatin is a precursor to the related hormone traumatic acid.

References

Fatty aldehydes
Fatty acids
Plant hormones
Aldehydic acids